Nicole Cage-Florentiny is a poet and novelist, born on 12 September 1965 in Le François, Martinique. She is a teacher of literature and Spanish, a psychotherapist and the founder of the publisher Cimarrón EdiProd.

In her writing Cage-Florentiny addresses contemporary and sometimes taboo subjects in Martinique society; her first novel C’est vole que je vole, is "a novel on madness and massacred childhood". She has also written stories for children, to support the development of their cultural awareness. 

She has travelled widely to perform at poetry festivals across the Caribbean, the Americas, Europe and North Africa. Cage-Florentiny regularly produces "pawol ek mizik" shows mixing spoken word, song, dance and visual arts with musical accompaniament. Her writing has been translated into Albanian, English, Arabic, Spanish, Macedonian, Portuguese and Romanian and has appeared in literary magazines in Albania, Macedonia (in the anthology, "Ditët ë Naïmit"), the United States (MaComère, San Francisco Bay View), Lebanon, Romania and Latin America.

Works 

 1996: Arc-en-ciel, l'espoir, poems in bilingual edition (trans. Nancy Morejón), Casa de las Américas, Cuba
 2000: Confidentiel, children's novel, Édition Dapper, Paris
 2002: L'Espagnole, Hatier Publishing, Paris
 2005 and 2006: Aime comme musique ou comme mourir d'aimer, novel, published by Le Manuscrit and Scripta in 2006
 2006: C'est vole que je vole, Les Oiseaux de papier, Bretagne
 2007: Et tu dis que tu m'aimes, Les Oiseaux de papier, Bretagne
 2007: Une robe couleur soleil conte pour enfants, Éditions Lafontaine, Fort-de-France
 2007: Palabras de paz por tiempos de guerra, poems, El Perro y la Rana, Caracas
 2008: Dèyé pawol sé lanmou / Beyond words, love, bilingual poems (French/Creole) Preface by Frankétienne, K Éditions, Fort-de-France
 2009: Vole avec elle, novel, éditions Acoria, Paris

Prizes 

 1996: Awarded the Casa de las Américas Prize in Cuba for her collection of poems Arc-en-Ciel, l'espoir
 2002: Oeneumi Prize, at the Ditet e Naimit International Festival in the Republic of Macedonia, for a selection of unpublished poems
 2004: Creativity Prize from the NAAMAN Foundation for Culture in Lebanon for Paroles de paix pour temps de guerre, poems
 2006: Gros Sel Prize for her novel C'est vole que je vole

References 

Martiniquais people
Martiniquais women
Martiniquais poets
Martiniquais novelists
Martinican culture
21st-century French poets
21st-century French novelists
French psychotherapists
1965 births
Living people